This is a list of Philippine Basketball Association players by total career free throws made.

Statistics accurate as of December 22, 2022.

See also
List of Philippine Basketball Association players

References

External links
Philippine Basketball Association All-time Leaders in Most Free Throws Made – PBA Online.net

Free Throw, Career